Leon G. Thomas III (born ) is an American actor, record producer, songwriter and singer. After early roles in Broadway and providing the singing voice of Tyrone on the Nick Jr. animated series The Backyardigans (2006–2008), he played André Harris on the Nickelodeon series Victorious (2010–2013), for which he received a NAACP Image Award nomination. 

Thomas signed to Columbia and Rostrum Records, and sought success for his songwriting, and as a member of the production duo the Rascals. He has earned writing credits on Ariana Grande's Positions, Drake's Certified Lover Boy, and Toni Braxton and Babyface's Grammy Award-winning album Love, Marriage & Divorce (2014). Thomas earned a Grammy Award for Best Rap Song nomination at the 62nd Annual Grammy Awards, for co-writing the song "Gold Roses" (2019).

Life and career 
Leon G. Thomas III was born in Brooklyn, New York City, to Jayon Anthony and Leon Thomas II. He made his Broadway debut at the age of 10 in 2003 as Young Simba in the Broadway production of The Lion King. In 2004, he appeared as Jackie Thibodeaux in the original Broadway cast of Tony Kushner's Caroline, or Change. and toured with the company during its five-month run in Los Angeles and San Francisco. Thomas also performed in the Broadway production of The Color Purple. In 2007, Thomas appeared in the film August Rush as Arthur, performing the song "La Bamba", and briefly after signed a development deal with Nickelodeon appearing as the singing voice for Tyrone in the computer-animated musical series The Backyardigans. Thomas has also guest-starred on Jack's Big Music Show and Just Jordan. He also appeared as Harper in the iCarly episode "iCarly Saves TV" and was featured on The Naked Brothers Band Christmas Special.

He played a main character  on Victorious, portraying Andre Harris, which premiered on Nickelodeon on March 27, 2010. Thomas also appeared as Andre Harris in the crossover episode between Victorious and iCarly, "iParty with Victorious". He also appeared as himself in an episode of True Jackson, VP. On August 2, 2011, the soundtrack album Victorious: Music from the Hit TV Show was released, with Thomas featured in the songs "Song 2 You" (written by him) and "Tell Me That You Love Me". On June 5, 2012, Victorious 2.0: More Music from the Hit TV Show was also released, with Thomas featured in the songs "Countdown" and "Don't You (Forget About Me)". The Victorious television series ended production in July 2012 and the series' last episode aired on February 2, 2013.
In 2012, Thomas started to record his first mixtape called Metro Hearts; it was released on August 1, 2012. Songs on the mixtape Metro Hearts include "Forever", "Bad", "Moving On", "Vibe", "Like Clay" and "Never Look Back". The mixtape also included a cover of Drake's "Take Care" with Ariana Grande. Leon Thomas co-wrote the song "Ain't No Other Me" for the British girl group Stooshe, which features as a deluxe edition track on their debut album, London with the Lights On. Thomas co-wrote four songs on his former co-star Ariana Grande's 2013 album "Yours Truly". He also co-produced four songs on Yours Truly, in addition to the song "Last Christmas" from Grande's Christmas Kisses EP, as a member of production duo The Rascals. His production work under The Rascals was also included on Toni Braxton & Babyface's Grammy award-winning album Love, Marriage & Divorce, contributing to the Toni Braxton solo "I'd Rather Be Broke" performed by Toni Braxton.

On September 24, 2013, Leon Thomas released a new single, "Hello How Are You", featuring Wiz Khalifa. On January 1, 2014, Thomas released a new mixtape, V1bes, under the name Leon Thomas, via Datpiff. He also announced that a music video for his single "Hello How Are You" was in the works. In 2016, he served as a co-producer for Post Malone's album Stoney. 

In 2016, Thomas released the mixtape Before the Beginning via SoundCloud, which compiled eight songs which he had "[held on] for a long time". In 2017, he appeared in the Kathryn Bigelow-directed film Detroit.

In the year of 2018 saw the release of Thomas' debut EP Genesis, which featured guest appearances from Buddy and Tayla Parx. The next year, Thomas earned a Grammy Award for Best Rap Song nomination at the 62nd Annual Grammy Awards for co-writing and co-producing the Rick Ross and Drake song "Gold Roses". Thomas would also go on to write and produce more records under the Rascals production duo, as well as a solo producer, co-writing and co-producing two songs on Ariana Grande's Positions, and three songs on Drake's Certified Lover Boy.

In May 2022, hip-hop musician Ty Dolla $ign signed a joint venture deal with Motown for his newly-launched EZMNY Records imprint, announcing Thomas to be the label's first artist.

Filmography

Discography

Studio albums

Mixtapes

Extended plays

Singles

As lead artist

As featured artist

Promotional singles

Other charted songs

Other releases
{| class="wikitable plainrowheaders" style="text-align:center;"
|+ List of non-single releases, showing year released and album name
! scope="col"| Title
! scope="col"| Year
! scope="col"| Other artist(s)
! scope="col"| Album
|-
! scope="row| "Sing the Day"
| 2006
| Anika Noni Rose, Harrison Chad, Marcus Carl Franklin
| Bambi II
|-
! scope="row"| "La Bamba"
| 2007
| rowspan="2" 
| August Rush|-
! scope="row"| "I Like That Girl"
| 2008
| iCarly: Music from and Inspired by the Hit TV Show|-
! scope="row"| "Free to Fall"
| rowspan="2"| 2010
| Kyle Riabko, Jessie Payo, Natalie Hall
| rowspan="2"| Rising Stars|-
! scope="row"| "A Better Day"
| Kyle Riabko
|-
! scope="row"| "All I Want"
| 2011
| Roshon Fegan
| 
|-
! scope="row"| "365 Days"
| 2012
| Victorious cast
| Victorious 3.0: Even More Music from the Hit TV Show|-
! scope="row"| "Yes We Can"
| 2013
| Nat and Alex Wolff, Natasha Bedingfield
| Throwbacks 
|-
! scope="row"| "Show Us"
| rowspan="3"| 2014
| rowspan="4" 
| rowspan="2" 
|-
! scope="row"| "Miss You"
|-
! scope="row"| "Nothing"
| The Best of Both Offices Compilation Vol. 4|-
! scope="row"| "Too Long"
| 2015
| 
|-
! scope="row"| "Fire"
| rowspan="2"| 2016
| Finding Noyvon, J.Kelr
| Believe in MPLS|-
! scope="row"| "Teacher"
| Yonni
| #TheGift|-
! scope="row"| "Balance"
| 2017
| RichGains, GLC, Nate Mercereau
| Gains|-
! scope="row"| "Zen"
| 2018
| Bizzy Crook
| Before I Jump|-
! scope="row"| "Arcadia (For the Land)"
|2020
| WavelQ
| Arcadia|-
! scope="row"| "Lord Knows"
| rowspan="2"| 2022
| Steelo, DeJ Loaf
| Eldorado Excursions|-
! scope="row"| "Patience (Remix)
| Eric Bellinger
| New Light: The Remixes
|}

Music videos

Production and songwriting credits

Broadway appearancesThe Lion KingCaroline, or ChangeThe Color Purple''

Concert tours
Big Time Summer Tour (joined on August 21, 2012)

Awards and nominations

References

External links
 

1993 births
Living people
21st-century American male actors
21st-century American singers
African-American male actors
African-American male singers
American child singers
American male child actors
American male film actors
American male singers
American male television actors
Columbia Records artists
Male actors from New York (state)
Male actors from New York City
Musicians from Brooklyn
Singers from New York City